Shatang Town is an urban township  in Shuangfeng County, Hunan Province, People's Republic of China.

Administrative division
The township is divided into 31 villages, the following areas: Daxi Village, Jingyang Village, Huangtuba Village, Hengtian Village, Jinglin Village, Shuangyong Village, Lashu Village, Jingmin Village, Shatian Village, Shuiyuan Village, Shiqiao Village, Yanxiao Village, shishui Village, Hongyun Village, Dashi Village, Hongtian Village, Shaping Village, Shatang Village, Shantang Village, Shantang Village, Xiangshui Village, Bandong Village, Huitian Village, Shixing Village, Baishi Village, Shifeng Village, Zifeng Village, Mitang Village, Shangyan Village, Zitian Village, Zixing Village, and Zhongshi Village (大西村、荆阳村、黄土坝村、横田村、荆林村、双永村、腊树村、荆民村、沙田村、水源村、石桥村、燕宵村、湿水村、红云村、大石村、洪田村、沙坪村、沙塘村、善塘村、响水村、板洞村、辉田村、石星村、白石村、石峰村、紫峰村、密塘村、上燕村、梓田村、梓星村、忠实村)

Divisions of Shuangfeng County